HMCS Lauzon was the name of multiple ships of the Royal Canadian Navy:

 , a River-class frigate, later converted to a Prestonian-class frigate with the pennant number FFE 321
 , a River-class frigate renamed Glace Bay

Battle honours
Atlantic, 1944–45

References

 Government of Canada Ships' Histories - HMCS Lauzon

Royal Canadian Navy ship names